The London Football Association (LFA) is the regional Football Association for inner areas of London. The London FA was established in 1882 and is affiliated to The Football Association. The London FA administers all levels of men's, women's and junior football within its area, a circle 12 miles in radius with Charing Cross at the centre.

History

The London Football Association (LFA) is unique for the reason that it is the only one founded by The Football Association. While others were founded to organise football locally around the country, Charles Alcock and Lord Kinnaird, then Secretary and Chairman of The FA, created the London FA to deal with local clubs and competitions while the main body focused on the Laws of the Game and international football matters.

According to the Memorandum on Areas and Overlapping of Associations the London FA covers the area 12 miles from Charing Cross. The association is ‘overlapped’ by a number of its colleague County FA ’s: Essex FA, Kent FA, Middlesex FA, Surrey FA and the Amateur Football Alliance.

The first Secretary was N. L. 'Pa' Jackson who was also serving on the FA Council. He was famous for founding the Corinthians Football Club and is said to be the inventor of the international cap.
 
The London FA's other claim to fame is that its representative team was the first ever English team to play in a European final, the Inter-Cities Fairs Cup final in 1958 where they lost over two legs to Barcelona. Friendly matches had also been played against foreign opposition after the end of World War II, including annual matches in Belgium.

It has had many headquarters since its foundation in 1882, including Paternoster Row, St. Mark's College Chelsea, Finsbury Barracks, Leytonstone, Manor Park, Barking, and Lewisham. It even stayed temporarily at Upton Park and Highbury during the Second World War, having been bombed out of its previous homes. The current headquarters in Fulham were moved into in August 2004. A centenary match for the association was played in 1981 between a London XI and an England XI at Highbury, however only 5,000 fans attended.

The London Football Association is one of the biggest in the country with over 2,000 clubs, about 1,000 referees and over 50 Leagues/Competitions.

The association has a history of long-serving, dedicated officials. For example, Tommy Kirkup served as Secretary for 44 years between 1903 and 1947. Basil Stallard is by far the longest serving Treasurer having been in that position since 1973. There have been only nine Presidents since 1882, Lionel Seymour being the current incumbent.

In 1922 the London Minor Football Association was founded for youth football. It became the London Youth Football Association and continues to administer youth football in the capital to this day. It did, however, come under the London FA Limited when it incorporated in 2001.

Both the Inner London County Schools Football Association and London Football Coaches Association work in collaboration with the London FA for the mutual benefit of its members. This provides participants in the capital with a complete range of opportunities in football.

The LFA runs high quality coaching courses throughout the year with one of the countries senior coach education tutors as Head Coach in John Drabwell. As a result of the Football Association's National Game Strategy 2008–2012, the LFA has recruited a young and energetic development team under the leadership of Josie Clifford.

Affiliated leagues

Men's Saturday leagues
Bromley and South London Football League (2017)
West End (London) AFA (1881)
Wimbledon and District League (1898)

Footnote: No leagues belong to the English football league system.

Men's Sunday leagues
Camden Sunday League (1948)
Central London Super Sunday League (2008)
Hackney and Leyton Sunday League (1947)
Inner London League (2001)
Metropolitan Sunday League (1934)
North London Sunday League (1985)
Southern Sunday League (1944)
Sportsman’s Senior Sunday League (1949)
Wandsworth and District Sunday League (1949)
West Fulham Sunday League (1936)
Woolwich and Eltham Sunday Football Alliance (2006)

Small Sided leagues
Hamlets 7-a-Side League (2007)
Lillie Road Five-a-Side League

Other leagues
All Nations Football Festival Summer League (2001)
Association of Provincial Supporters Clubs in London (1983)
Ballerz League (2008)
Bangladesh Football Association Summer League (2007)
Brixton Summer League
Bromley and Croydon Christian League (1994)
Cypriot League (KOPA) (1974)
East London Christian League
Football for Christ Championship (1998)
Islington Midweek League (1973)
Lionheart Surveyors League (2001)
London Accountants League
London Communities League
London Underground League (1996)
Maccabi (Southern) League
Maccabi Masters League (1999)
MPAA Internal Leagues (2007)
Southern Veterans League
Street League
Thames League
Turkish Community Football Federation (1976)

Ladies and girls leagues
London and South East Regional Women's League
Greater London Womens League
Capital Girls League 
South London Girls League

Youth leagues
Ballerz League (Youth) (2008)
Bangladesh Football Association (UK) (Youth) (2010)
Bexley and District Junior (and Mini-Soccer) League
Brixton Summer League (Youth)
Camden and Islington Youth League (1968)
East London and Essex Junior League (1998)
Hackney Youth League
London County Saturday Youth League
Maccabi GB Junior (Youth) (2007)
Maccabi Junior League
Positive Youth Community League (2007)
South East London and Kent Youth League (2002)
South London Special League (Youth) (2004)
Tandridge Youth League
Tandridge Youth Mini Soccer Tournament
Turkish Community Football Federation Youth League
Waltham Forest and District Youth League

Futsal leagues
Futsal Super League
Newham Futsal League
Newham Futsal League (Youth)

Cup competitions
Beckenham Hospital Charity Invitation Football Cup (Saturday) (1903)
East Ham Memorial Hospital Charity Cup Competition (1901)
Hays Property and Surveying Cup

Disbanded or amalgamated leagues

Leagues that were affiliated to the London FA (or FA) but have disbanded or amalgamated with other leagues include:

Major non-League leagues
Aetolian League
Athenian League
Corinthian League
Delphian League
Greater London League (formed by a merger of the Aetolian and London Leagues)
London League
Metropolitan League
Metropolitan–London League (formed by a merger of the Metropolitan and Greater London Leagues)
Parthenon League
Spartan League (known as the London Spartan League for a few season following a merger with the Metropolitan–London League)

Other leagues

Asian Premier League (founded 2009, dissolved 2012)
Beckenham League
Bermondsey League
Bromley and District Football League
Camberwell League
Clapham League
Delphis Sunday Football League (incorporated in London and Kent Border Football League)
East London Sunday League (1930)
Enfield Football Alliance (founded 1941, dissolved 2012)
Finchley and District League
Ford Sunday League
Herald League
Lewisham League
London and Kent Border Football League
London City Airport Sunday League
London Shipping League
Northern Suburban Intermediate League

South East London Amateur League
South London Football Alliance
South London League
Southern Alliance
Southern Suburban League (also known as South Suburban League)
Tottenham & District Junior Alliance League
United Senior League
Walthamstow and District League
Wandsworth and District League 
West London League
West London Alliance League
Woolwich and District League

Member and associated clubs

It is difficult to provide a comprehensive list of those notable clubs that are (or at one time were) affiliated to the London FA.  However, by identifying those clubs that have competed in the London Senior Cup along with those clubs that are (or were) located in the Greater London area it is possible to establish the following list:

2nd Grenadier Guards (now defunct)
3rd Grenadier Guards (now defunct)
A.F.C. Hayes
A.F.C. Hornchurch
Argonauts (now defunct)
Barking
Barkingside
Beckenham Town
Bedfont
Bedfont Town
Bethnal Green United
Bexley United (now defunct)
Bishop's Stortford
Boreham Wood
Briggs Sports (now defunct)
Brimsdown Rovers
Bromley
Carshalton Athletic
Casuals (became Corinthian-Casuals)
Clapham Rovers
Clapton
Cockfosters
Colliers Wood United
Corinthian (became Corinthian-Casuals)

Corinthian-Casuals
Cray Wanderers
Croydon
Croydon Athletic
Croydon Common (now defunct)
Dagenham (became Dagenham & Redbridge)
Dulwich Hamlet
Enfield
Enfield Town
Erith & Belvedere
Erith Town
Farnborough Town
Finchley
Fisher
Fisher Athletic (now defunct)
Greenwich Borough
Hampton & Richmond Borough
Hanwell Town
Haringey & Waltham Development
Haringey Borough
Harrow Borough
Hayes (became Hayes & Yeading United)
Hayes & Yeading United

Hendon
Hillingdon Borough
Hitchin Town
Ilford
Kingsbury London Tigers
Kingstonian
Leatherhead
Leyton (now defunct)
Leytonstone (became Dagenham & Redbridge)
London All Peoples Sports Association
London Caledonians (now defunct)
London Welsh
Metropolitan Police F.C.
North Greenford United
Northwood
Old Castle Swifts (became West Ham United)
Redbridge
Redbridge Forest (became Dagenham & Redbridge)
Royal Ordnance Factories (now defunct)
St. Albans City
Seven Acre & Sidcup
Shepherd's Bush (now defunct)

Southall
South Kilburn
Sporting Bengal United
Staines Town
Surbiton (now defunct)
Sutton United
Thames (now defunct)
Thames Ironworks (became West Ham United)
Thamesmead Town
Tooting & Mitcham United
Upton Park (now defunct)
Uxbridge
Waltham Abbey
Waltham Forest
Walthamstow Avenue (became Dagenham & Redbridge)
Walton & Hersham
Wealdstone
Welling United
Wingate & Finchley
Wanderers
Woking
Yeading (became Hayes & Yeading United))

Clubs in the Premier League and The Football League that have competed in the London FA's London Charity Cup or are located in the Greater London area include:

AFC Wimbledon
Arsenal
Barnet
Brentford

Charlton Athletic
Chelsea
Crystal Palace
Dagenham & Redbridge

Fulham
Leyton Orient
Millwall
Queens Park Rangers

Tottenham Hotspur
West Ham United
Wimbledon (now defunct)

County Cup competitions

Today the London Football Association runs 9 different County Cup competitions:

 The London Senior Cup;
 The London Intermediate Cup – commenced in 1914–15;
 The London Junior Cup;
 The London FA Women's Cup – first contested in 1994–95.;
 The London Women's Junior Cup
 The London Veterans Cup;
 The London Sunday Intermediate Cup;
 The London Sunday Junior Cup; and 
 The London Sunday Challenge Cup.

 Turnham Green Trophy
 Jack Morgan Cup
 Marcus Lipton Cup
 Presidents Charity Cup
The LFA also formerly ran the following competitions:
 London Charity Cup – discontinued in 1975 
 London Challenge Cup – discontinued in 2000

List of recent London Cup winners

Source

List of recent London Sunday and Veterans Cup winners

Source

Members of council

President
Lionel Seymour

Vice presidents
Basil Stallard (1973)
Stan Nathan (1966)
David Richbell (1969)
David Wolff (1970)
Clive Coleman (1974)
Michael McElligott (1974)
Norman Moss (1976)
Maurice Hales  B.E.M (1977) 
Bob Henderson (1977)
Darryl Ryan (1981)

Chairman
Tony Sharples (1981)

Vice chairman
George Dorling (1983)

Honorary treasurer
Basil Stallard (1973)

Honorary life members
Lawrie Aldridge (1960)
Ron Halfacre (1964) 
Harry Hall (1973)
Cyril Rebak (1973)

Directors and officials

Board of directors
L.J. Seymour (President)
David Fowkes (	Chief Executive and Company Secretary)
RA Blackman 	
G Dorling
BJ Miller
B Stallard
AJ Sharples 
GC Taylor
CD Wheeler

Key officials
Paul Bickerton (	Chief Executive)
Josie Clifford (County Development Manager)

See also
 Football in London
 London Senior Cup
 London Intermediate Cup

References

External links

Presidents Charity Cup
London FA Tournaments

County football associations
1882 establishments in England
Football Association, London
Sports organizations established in 1882
1882 in London
1882 sports events in London